Summerdale may refer to

Places
Summerdale, Alabama
Summerdale, Pennsylvania
Summerdale (Neighborhood), Philadelphia, PA

Other
the Summerdale scandals